Eugen Fink (11 December 1905 – 25 July 1975) was a German philosopher.

Biography
Fink was born in 1905 as the son of a government official in Germany. He spent his first school years with an uncle who was a Catholic priest. Fink attended a grammar school in Konstanz where he succeeded with his extraordinary memory. After his graduation exam in 1925, he studied philosophy, history, German language and economics, initially at Münster and Berlin and then in Freiburg with Edmund Husserl.

Philosophy
As Husserl's assistant, he was a representative of phenomenological idealism and later a follower of Martin Heidegger. He approached the problem of Being as a manifestation of the cosmic movement with Man being a participant in this movement. Fink called the philosophical problems pre-questions, that will lead to the true philosophy by the way of an ontological practice.

Works
 Vom Wesen des Enthusiasmus, Freiburg 1947
 Zur ontologischen Frühgeschichte von Raum - Zeit - Bewegung, Den Haag 1957
 Alles und Nichts, Den Haag 1959
 Spiel als Weltsymbol, Stuttgart 1960
 Nietzsches Philosophie, Stuttgart 1960
 Metaphysik und Tod, Stuttgart 1969
 Heraklit. Seminar mit Martin Heidegger, Frankfurt/Main 1970
 Erziehungswissenschaft und Lebenslehre, Freiburg 1970
 Natur, Freiheit, Welt : Philosophie der Erziehung, Wuerzburg, 1992
 Sein und Mensch. Vom Wesen der ontologischen Erfahrung, Freiburg 1977
 Grundfragen der systematischen Pädagogik, Freiburg 1978
 Grundphänomene des menschlichen Daseins, Freiburg 1979
 Grundfragen der antiken Philosophie, Würzburg 1985
 VI. Cartesianische Meditation. I: Die Idee einer Transzendentalen Methodenlehre Dordrecht 1988
 Welt und Endlichkeit, Würzburg 1990
 Hegel, Frankfurt 2006
 Eugen Fink Gesamtausgabe edited by Cathrin Nielsen and Hans Rainer Sepp in collaboration with Franz-Anton Schwarz, Freiburg: Alber, 2006-
 Published volumes:
 Vol. 1. Nähe und Distanz. Studien zur Phänomenologie (2011); 
 Vol. 3.1 Die Doktorarbeit und erste Assistenzjahre bei Husserl (2006); 
 Vol. 3.3 Grammata: zu Husserls Krisis-Schriften, Dorothy Ott-Seminare, Interpretationen zu Kant und Hegel, Notizen zu Gesprächen im Umkreis der Freiburger Phänomenologie. (2011);
 Vol. 7 Spiel als Weltsymbol (2010);
 Vol. 13 Epilegomena zu I. Kants Kritik der reinen Vernunft (2010).

English translations
 Play as Symbol of the World. And Other Writings. Translated with an introduction by Ian Alexander Moore and Christopher Turner. Bloomington: Indiana University Press, 2016.
 Sixth Cartesian meditation. The Idea of a Transcendental Theory of Method with textual notations by Edmund Husserl. Translated with an introduction by Ronald Bruzina, Bloomington: Indiana University Press, 1995
 Nietzsche's Philosophy translated by Goetz Richter London, New York: Continuum, 2003
 Heraclitus Seminar. with Martin Heidegger, (Winter semester 1966/1967 at Freiburg University), Evanston, Ill.: Northwestern University Press, 1993
 Cairns, Dorion, Conversations with Husserl and Fink. The Hague: Martinus Nijhoff, 1976
 "Oasis of Happiness: Thoughts toward an Ontology of Play". Translated by Ian Alexander Moore and Christopher Turner. Purlieu: A Philosophical Journal 1, no. 4 (2012), pp. 20–42.

References
 Ronald Bruzina, Edmund Husserl & Eugen Fink: Beginnings and Ends in Phenomenology 1928-1938, New Haven: Yale University Press, 2004 
 Stuart Elden, "Eugen Fink and the Question of the World", Parrhesia: A Journal of Critical Philosophy 2008;5:48-59 .

External links 
 
 Eugen-Fink-Archiv
 Center for Advanced Research in Phenomenology

1905 births
1975 deaths
20th-century German non-fiction writers
20th-century German philosophers
Continental philosophers
Critical theorists
Epistemologists
German male non-fiction writers
German male writers
Idealists
Ontologists
People from Konstanz
People from the Grand Duchy of Baden
Phenomenologists
Philosophers of economics
Philosophers of education
Philosophers of history
Philosophers of mind